Jaume Nomen Torres (also: Jaime Nomen; born June 23, 1960 in Tortosa, Catalonia) is a Spanish oral and maxillofacial surgeon, amateur astronomer and discoverer of numerous minor planets. He is of Catalan origin and became publicly known for the discovery of the near-Earth asteroid  (later named 367943 Duende) by the OAM team (of which he is a member) during the La Sagra Sky Survey. The asteroid 56561 Jaimenomen is named after him.

Nomen is a prolific discoverer of asteroids, professor in the University of Barcelona and an active member of GEA, (Grup d'Estudis Astronòmics, Barcelona). He has discovered more than sixty asteroids of which 55 have been numbered. He is the director of the Unicorn Project 3SSS, that places three automatic telescopes of 61 cm diameter in the Piera Observatory, l'Ametlla de Mar Observatory and Costitx Observatory to increase the capacity of detection and study of the asteroids.

References

External links 
 Asteroid 2102 DA14 Has Date With Earth Friday, ABCnews, 15 February 2013
   

1960 births
Astronomers from Catalonia
Discoverers of asteroids
Living people
20th-century Spanish astronomers
21st-century Spanish astronomers